Zachary Mortensen (born October 5, 1972, in Madison, Wisconsin) is an American film producer, writer and founder of the production company Ghost Robot.

Biography
Zachary Mortensen is the founder of Ghost Robot, a production and management company in New York City. In 2006 Mortensen produced the feature films Choking Man by iconoclastic music video director Steve Barron, which premiered at the Tribeca Film Festival and Dr. Bronner's Magic Soapbox, a film about E. H. Bronner by director Sara Lamm, which premiered at the Mill Valley Film Festival. "Dr. Bronner's Magic Soapbox" was released in theaters in the summer of 2007 by Balcony Releasing. Mortensen's feature film Road by director Leslie McCleave premiered at the Los Angeles Film Festival in 2005 where it was awarded outstanding performance for the two leads, Catherine Kellner and Ebon Moss-Bachrach and was released theatrically in 2006 by 7th Art Releasing.

In 2001, Mortensen produced the feature documentary Hell House by director George Ratliff which premiered at the Toronto International Film Festival and was released theatrically in fall 2002. Mortensen produced the award winning documentary features Breath Control: The History of the Human Beat Box and The Federation of Black Cowboys. He also produced the theatrical documentary Stoked: The Rise and Fall of Gator directed by Helen Stickler.

Mortensen produced The New Arrival by Amy Talkington, which was the first motion picture using 360-degree video technology. The movie was a collaboration between Intel Corporation, Atom Films, and BeHere, the company behind the revolutionary technology, and it premiered at the market at the Cannes Film Festival in 2000.  The following year, Mortensen produced the first commercially released Music video created entirely with Machinima software. That video was In the Waiting Line by the band Zero 7, directed by Tommy Pallotta.

In 1997–98, Mortensen was the Director of Production at Caipirinha Productions, where he supervised the post-production and distribution of the critically acclaimed documentary feature Modulations.

Mortensen is the writer and creator of the scifi comic series The Gatecrashers which was drawn by Sutu the artist behind the award-winning web series Nawlz. The Gatecrashers first book A Night of Gatecrashing was named to The Village Voice'''s best Comics and Graphic Novels of 2014.

Mortensen continues to produce feature films, commercials, music videos, and television.

Selected filmographyCreative Control (film) (2016) producerThanksgiving (2014) producerUnity of All Things (2013) producerBirth Story: Ina May Gaskin and the Farm Midwives (2013) producerFirst Winter (2012) producerLove Letter (2011) executive producerAgainst The Current (2008) co-executive producerCropsey (2008) producerDr. Bronner's Magic Soapbox (2006) producerChoking Man (2006) producerRoad (2005) producerPhileine zegt sorry (2003) line producerIn the Waiting Line (2003) producerThe Federation of Black Cowboys (2003) producerStoked: The Rise and Fall of Gator (2002) producerBreath Control: The History of the Human Beat Box (2002) producerDestiny (2002) (V) producerTrappedinfreedom (2002) producerHell House (2001) producerThe New Arrival (2000) producerSecond Skins (1998) producer
March 29, 1979 (1997) producer
Highball (1997) line producer
Vertical City (1996) line producer
America's Most Wanted producer, 4 episodes
Bittersweet Motel (2000) production manager: "The Great Went"
Modulations (1998) post-production supervisor
Wrestling With Alligators (1998) production manager
Scrapple (1998) production manager
Ties to Rachel (1997) unit manager

References

External links

Ghost Robot Production Company
The Gatecrashers Universe
Village Voice Best of 2014 Comics & Graphic Novels
Bleeding Cool Spotlight on Indie Comics Top 15 of 2014

American film producers
Living people
Tisch School of the Arts alumni
1972 births